Etok is a surname. Notable people with the surname include:

Tivi Etok (born 1929), Canadian Inuit artist
Aloysius Akpan Etok (born 1958), Nigerian politician